Liadytiscinae is a subfamily of extinct predaceous diving beetles in the family Dytiscidae. There are about 5 genera and 10 described species in Liadytiscinae. All currently known members of the subfamily are known from the Early Cretaceous Jehol Biota of China.

Genera
These five genera belong to the subfamily Liadytiscinae:
 † Liadroporus Prokin & Ren, 2010 Yixian Formation, China, Early Cretaceous (Aptian)
 † Liadytiscus Prokin & Ren, 2010 Yixian Formation, China, Early Cretaceous (Aptian)
 † Mesoderus Prokin & Ren, 2010 Yixian Formation, China, Early Cretaceous (Aptian)
 † Liadyxianus Prokin, Petrov, B. Wang & Ponomarenko, 2013 Yixian Formation, China, Early Cretaceous (Aptian)
 † Mesodytes Prokin, Petrov, Wang & Ponomarenko, 2013 Yixian Formation, China, Early Cretaceous (Aptian)

References

Further reading

 
 
 
 
 

Dytiscidae